Eela Water is a freshwater loch (lake) in Northmavine, part of the mainland of Shetland in Scotland. Besides being a freshwater fishing location, the site supplies clean water for the mainland of Shetland, and is one of the largest lochs on the mainland.

Description 
The term Eela is used in Shetland to describe a fishing place, particularly one near to the shore of a body of water. It also used to describe a type of rod fishing, derived from dialectal Norwegian, Ila, which described a type of stone anchor. The Eela rod fishing involved doing so from calm waters, or rowing into the tide and holding the boat steady (usually trying to catch coalfish). However, Tudor states that the name was originally Ola's Water, a personal name. The bedrock that the loch sits on is mixed, but mostly made up of schists and pink granite, and the surrounding earth made up of peat. The inflows of water have been determined to be of low alkalinity. The granite lies mostly to the east of the loch, which is where the depth dips down sharply to the maximum depth, and the eastern shore is mostly rocky too.

The outflow from Eela Water heads west through Little Eela Water and the Burn of Eelawater to head out to sea through Hamar Voe, a distance of only .

The loch also has a water treatment works (WTW), for supplying freshwater to the mainland of Shetland. These were installed in 2007, replacing some earlier WTWs, at a cost of £1.1 million. The WTW plant is adjacent to the B9079 from Ollaberry, and pumps water to the rest of the mainland in a pipeline through Mavis Grind. The A970 road traverses the east side of the loch connecting Brae and North Roe.

Gammarus lacustris is noted to be present in Eela Water, as are a species of mayfly, known as baetis rhodani. The loch is also noted for its trout fishing. Birds that have been observed at the loch include black-headed gull, common gull, common sandpiper, curlew, eider, golden plover, great skua, greylag goose, lesser black backed gull, oystercatcher, snipe, teal and tufted duck. In 2008, the Scottish Environmental Protection Agency listed Eela Water as having a good ecological status.

Historically the loch featured as one of the boundary markers of the old Northmavine North Parish.

Loch data 
It is one of the largest lochs on the mainland of Shetland, the largest being the Loch of Girlsta, which has about three times the amount of water as Eela Water does.

References

Sources

External links 
Eela Water on Let's Fish
1903 survey of Eela Water

Lochs of Shetland
Northmavine